Richelle Cranston (born 28 September 1989) is an Australian rules footballer playing for the Western Bulldogs football Club in the AFL Women's (AFLW). She was drafted by Melbourne with their third selection and twenty-fourth overall in the 2016 AFL Women's draft. She was suspended for one match after her debut match due to front on contact with Brisbane's Jamie Stanton. After returning from suspension, she played every match for the year to finish with six games.

Early life
Cranston grew up in New Zealand and then Maryborough, Victoria to New Zealand parents. She has Maori heritage and grew up playing American Football. 

She did not begin playing Australian Football until year 12. In 2011 she started with the North Ballarat Football Club and won the Kate Lawrence Medal in 2011 and 2012. She kicked 39 goals in her second season with the club playing at full forward. Cranston went on to represent Vic Country in 2014.

Cranston played senior gridiron with the Geelong Buccaneers as a fullback and tailback. She was the MVP for Gridiron Victoria in 2015 and was part of the team's back to back Vic Bowl sides and was their most valuable player in 2016. She also represented Victoria in the state's first ever representative women's team and made national selection. 

She also played at North Geelong Football Club and later the Western Bulldogs team from 2016/17 during the trial matches prior to the commencement of the AFLW.

AFL Career

Melbourne signed Cranston for the 2018 season during the trade period in May 2017.

In May 2018 Cranston accepted an offer from expansion club  to play with the club in the 2019 AFLW season. Cranston also played for Geelong's VFL Women's team for the 2018 season, and she won the club's 2018 best and fairest award.

In June 2021, Cranston was delisted by Geelong. A fortnight later, she was signed by the Western Bulldogs as a delisted free agent. She kept her preferred number of #30 as her guernsey number.

Statistics
Statistics are correct to the end of the 2021 season.

|- 
! scope="row" style="text-align:center" | 2017
|style="text-align:center;"|
| 30 || 6 || 1 || 3 || 25 || 19 || 44 || 9 || 18 || 0.2 || 0.5 || 4.2 || 3.2 || 7.3 || 1.5 || 3.0 || 0
|- style="background-color: #eaeaea"
| scope=row style="text-align:center" | 2018 || 
| 30 || 7 || 5 || 4 || 51 || 19 || 70 || 17 || 26 || 0.7 || 0.6 || 7.3 || 2.7 || 10.0 || 2.4 || 3.7 || 4
|- 
! scope="row" style="text-align:center" | 2019
|style="text-align:center;"|
| 30 || 6 || 1 || 3 || 62 || 32 || 94 || 13 || 27 || 0.2 || 0.5 || 10.3 || 5.3 || 15.7 || 2.2 || 4.5 || 3
|- style="background-color: #eaeaea"
! scope="row" style="text-align:center" | 2020
|style="text-align:center;"|
| 30 || 6 || 5 || 4 || 46 || 37 || 83 || 12 || 16 || 0.8 || 0.7 || 7.7 || 6.2 || 13.8 || 2.0 || 2.7 || 2
|- 
! scope="row" style="text-align:center" | 2021
|style="text-align:center;"|
| 30 || 9 || 5 || 2 || 47 || 16 || 63 || 12 || 17 || 0.6 || 0.2 || 5.2 || 1.8 || 7.0 || 1.3 || 1.9 || 0
|- class="sortbottom"
! colspan=3| Career
! 34
! 17
! 16
! 231
! 123
! 354
! 63
! 104
! 0.5
! 0.5
! 6.8
! 3.6
! 10.4
! 1.9
! 3.1
! 9
|}

References

External links 

1989 births
Living people
Melbourne Football Club (AFLW) players
Geelong Football Club (AFLW) players
Western Bulldogs (AFLW) players
Australian rules footballers from Victoria (Australia)
Victorian Women's Football League players